The 2015 Grand Prix de Futsal was the tenth edition of the international futsal competition of the same kind as the FIFA Futsal World Cup but with invited nations and held annually in Brazil. It was first held in 2005.

Participating

CONMEBOL (4)
 
 
 
 
AFC (1)
 

CONCACAF (1)
 

CAF (2)

First round

Group A

Group B

Final round

Classification 7th–8th

Classification 5th–6th

Classification 1st–4th

7th place match

5th place match

Semifinal

3rd place match

Final

Final standing

References

2015
2015 in Brazilian football
2015 in futsal